The Disney Afternoon (later known internally as the Disney-Kellogg Alliance when unbranded), sometimes abbreviated as TDA, was a created-for-syndication two-hour programming block of animated television series. It was produced by Walt Disney Television Animation and distributed through its syndication affiliate Buena Vista Television. Each show from the block has aired reruns on Disney Channel and Toon Disney. Disney Channel reaired four shows (Darkwing Duck, TaleSpin, DuckTales, and Chip 'n Dale: Rescue Rangers) on "Block Party," a two-hour block that aired on weekdays in the late afternoon/early evening.

The Disney Afternoon's block had four half-hour segments, each of which contained an animated series. As each season ended, the lineup would shift - the remaining three would move up a time slot and a new show would be added to the end. The Disney Afternoon itself featured unique animated segments consisting of its opening and "wrappers" around the cartoon shows.

The Disney Afternoon originally ran from September 10, 1990, to August 29, 1997. For the 1997 and 1998 television seasons, it lost its name but was known internally as Disney-Kellogg Alliance, shortened to 90 minutes, followed by its gradual replacement by Disney's One Too for UPN in 1999. Some of the shows also aired on Saturday mornings on ABC and CBS concurrently with their original syndicated runs on The Disney Afternoon.

Goof Troop is the only show to reach the 2000s, with the 2000 direct-to-video finale An Extremely Goofy Movie. The 2010s and 2020s saw revivals of some shows such as DuckTales as a reboot and Darkwing Duck as a show within the reboot on Disney Channel (and Disney XD), a reboot on Disney+, and Chip 'n Dale: Rescue Rangers with a live-action animation hybrid film on Disney+, released in 2022.

Background
The Disney Afternoon goes back to Michael Eisner becoming Disney's CEO in 1984 and his push into steady animated television production, which would be based on new characters to bring in new young fans, with a newly launched TV animation department. He set up a Sunday meeting at his house days consisting of creatives. They included Tad Stones from feature animation and Jymn Magon and Gary Kriesel from the music division. Mickey and the Space Pirates was pitched by Stones, but was turned down being that Mickey Mouse is the company symbol, thus wanting to do him right. Stones also pitched a Rescuers TV series – the sequel was already under development at the time. Eisner suggested the Gummy bear as a series, given his kids liked the candy. Disney Television Animation's first two shows, The Wuzzles and Adventures of the Gummi Bears, were sold to two networks, CBS and NBC, respectively, for their Saturday morning cartoon blocks.

History

The Disney Afternoon 
DuckTales, the series which would serve as the launching pad for what would become The Disney Afternoon, premiered in first-run syndication in the fall of 1987. Two years later in the fall of 1989, DuckTales was joined by Chip 'n Dale: Rescue Rangers, and both series were being offered in syndication as an hour-long program block. The Disney Afternoon kept these shows, added Gummi Bears and TaleSpin, and premiered on September 10, 1990, via Disney's syndication arm Buena Vista Television.

DuckTales had been airing on many affiliates of the then-young Fox network and its group of owned-and-operated stations, including KTTV in Los Angeles; this may have been due to the fact that the Walt Disney Company's chief operating officer at the time, Michael Eisner, and his then-Fox counterpart, Barry Diller, had worked together previously at ABC and at Paramount Pictures. However, as Chip 'n Dale was being launched, Disney was in the process of purchasing Los Angeles independent station KHJ-TV from RKO General. Through Buena Vista Television, Disney opted to reclaim the Los Angeles broadcast rights for DuckTales and moved it from KTTV to be paired with Chip 'n Dale on its newly-purchased station, which was renamed KCAL-TV in December 1989. Furious at the breach of contract, Diller pulled DuckTales from all of Fox's other owned-and-operated stations in the fall of 1989. Diller also encouraged the network's affiliates to do the same, though most did not initially. This caused the retaliatory formation of Fox Kids. (Ironically, most of the assets of Fox Kids would be bought by Disney in 2001 via their acquisition of Fox Family Worldwide.)

As the years went on, new shows would be added at the end of the block, with the oldest shows being dropped from the lineup. The 1991–92 season, for instance, saw Gummi Bears' removal, and Darkwing Duck being added to the end. After DuckTales, Chip 'n Dale Rescue Rangers, and TaleSpin were removed from the block in 1992, 1993 and 1994 prespectively, and they were replaced by Goof Troop, Bonkers, Gargoyles, and Aladdin as those shows continued to rerun in syndication until 1996.

By the fifth season in 1994, the block had undergone a makeover, with the primary branding being the block's initials, TDA. At this point, the original idea of shows being added and removed yearly was dropped, as both new and old shows were now stripped all week, or only aired on certain days. The original four shows were gone from the line up by the 1995–1996 season. The lineup at this point included Aladdin and Quack Pack stripped, while one daily slot was split between The Shnookums and Meat Funny Cartoon Show and Gargoyles, book-ending three days a week of Bonkers.

The Disney Channel developed a similar programming block called "Block Party", which premiered on October 2, 1995 (airing concurrently with TDA's sixth season) and was similarly scheduled and stripped with the early Disney Afternoon series of Darkwing Duck, TaleSpin, DuckTales, and Chip 'n Dale: Rescue Rangers.

Disney-Kellogg's Alliance 
By August 1996, owing to decreasing business in the syndicated children's television market due to new competitors such as the cable networks Cartoon Network and Nickelodeon, and the new networks The WB and UPN with having children's blocks of their own, Buena Vista agreed with the Leo Burnett agency to market and distribute a revamped version of the block for the 1997–98 and 1998–99 television seasons. Buena Vista established a partnership with Leo Burnett and Kellogg's—who had been a major sponsor of The Disney Afternoon, to purchase an amount of dedicated advertising inventory. The new block did not carry any blanket branding, but was referred to internally as the "Disney-Kellogg Alliance."

With the September 1, 1997 season started, the block dropped The Disney Afternoon name, a half-hour from the stripped block and the Gargoyles series. Moving to the Disney Channel were Disney's Aladdin and The Lion King's Timon & Pumbaa. 101 Dalmatians, which was shared with ABC's Disney's One Saturday Morning (which broadcast their own set of episodes), premiered on the block. Mighty Ducks and Quack Pack reruns shared the second slot in a Monday, Tuesday, and Wednesdays through Fridays, split respectively. DuckTales repeats filled the third half-hour slot, with flexibility for the local station to air it at other times.

In 1998, Disney reached a deal to program a new children's block for UPN, Disney's One Too, as a replacement for that network's internal UPN Kids block. The syndicated block ran until the debut of One Too on September 6, 1999.

International broadcasts
In Edmonton, Alberta, Canada, the city's then-independent TV station ITV (now Global Edmonton) produced its own version of The Disney Afternoon over roughly the same period as the American block, but only once per week in a two-hour block on Saturday afternoons, though using the same cartoon lineup as the American weekday block. Apart from the animated introduction, the block did not use any Disney-produced wrapper segments, but instead used locally produced live-action segments between programs with host Mike Sobel. 

In Denmark, DR1 started its version of the block ("Disney Sjov") on October 25th, 1991. The block was ended on December 30th, 2022.

Shows
Over the years, the block featured the following shows:

Adaptations

Comic books 
The block was adapted into comic books, films and launched the Disney Adventures magazine.

Disney Parks 
Characters from the shows first appeared in Disney Parks with the debut of Mickey's Birthdayland in the Magic Kingdom, Walt Disney World. In 1990, the characters got a daily show, "Mickey’s Magical TV World", which lasted until 1996.

The popularity of The Disney Afternoon led to a temporary attraction at Disneyland in Fantasyland called "Disney Afternoon Avenue." Disney Afternoon Avenue was a feature of Disneyland from March 15 to November 10, 1991. Two attractions were also made over to match series from the block.

Video games 
Many of The Disney Afternoon shows were made into video games.

Notes

References

External links

Disney Afternoon vs. Tiny Toons (1989) (first nine pages of publicity packet touting The Disney Afternoon over syndication offerings of Warner Bros.)

 
First-run syndicated television programs in the United States
Disney animated television series
Disney Channel
Television programming blocks
Television programming blocks in the United States
Television channels and stations established in 1990
Television channels and stations disestablished in 1997
Television series by Disney–ABC Domestic Television
Television syndication packages